Roman Danyliuk (born 7 March 1993) is a Ukrainian para-track and field athlete who competed at the 2016 Summer Paralympics in the T12/F12 shot put. He bronze medalled in the shot put with a season's best distance of 15.94 metres.

See also 
 Ukraine at the 2016 Summer Paralympics

References 

1993 births
Living people
Paralympic athletes of Ukraine
Paralympic bronze medalists for Ukraine
Ukrainian male shot putters
Paralympic medalists in athletics (track and field)
Athletes (track and field) at the 2016 Summer Paralympics
Athletes (track and field) at the 2020 Summer Paralympics
Medalists at the 2016 Summer Paralympics
Medalists at the 2020 Summer Paralympics